Club Ferro Carril Oeste Basquet, or Ferro Basquet, is a professional basketball team based in Caballito, Buenos Aires, Argentina. It is a part of the sports club Club Ferro Carril Oeste.

The club currently plays in Liga Nacional de Básquet, the top division of the Argentine basketball system. Ferro was the competition's first winner in 1985, with a total of 3 league titles won to date. It was also the first team to win two consecutive titles (1985–86), and the first Argentine team to become South American champion (in 1981). Besides, Ferro Carril Oeste is one of the three Argentine clubs to have played a final of the FIBA Intercontinental Cup (1986).

History
The club affiliated to Federación Argentina in 1921, playing in youth divisions. The first senior squad was formed in 1933, playing its first international v Uruguayan side Atenas de Montevideo. Ferro disaffiliated from the FAB in 1941, switching to recently founded "Asociación Argentina de Básquet" (AAB). Under the AAB, Ferro was runner-up in the 1956 Metropolitano, playing the final at Estadio Luna Park-

In 1968, Ferro was promoted to the first division of the Buenos Aires Basketball Association. In 1971 the club inaugurated its arena, "Estadio Héctor Etchart". In 1974, the two federations operating in Buenos Aires merged to form "Federación Única". By those times Ferro developed a strong rivalry with Obras Sanitarias. Coach León Najnudel arrived to the club in 1976. Under his leading and helped by notable players such as Miguel Cortijo, Ferro Carril Oeste achieved its first professional success, winning Torneo Metropolitano, Torneo Apertura and Torneo Oficial. The team also won the Campeonato Argentino de Clubes in 1981.

Ferro also became the first Argentine team to win the Campeonato Sudamericano de Clubes (South American Club Championship) in 1981 and 1982, with the second title after beating Obras Sanitarias in the final. Najnudel left the club to coach Spanish team CB Zaragoza, being replaced by former player Luis Martínez. The international success continued in 1987, with Ferro winning another edition of the Sudamericano.

When the top Liga Nacional de Básquet began in 1985, Ferro's main rival became Atenas de Córdoba. Ferro won the Argentine League championship in 1985 and 1986, finished 2nd in 1987, and also won it 1989. They also competed at the Club World Cup in 1981, 1986, and 1987, and they were that competition's runner-up in 1986.

At the end of 2003–04 season, Ferro was relegated to the Argentine second division, the Torneo Nacional de Ascenso (TNA). The team played there until 2015, when Ferro returned to LNB after Ciclista Juninense was relegated to TNA.

Players

Current roster

Notable players

 Miguel Cortijo (1976–92)
 Diego Maggi (1985–89)
 Rory White (1991–92)
 Gabriel Fernández (1995–96)
 Luis Scola (1995–98)
 Martín Leiva (1997–2001)
 Diego Lo Grippo (1998–2001)
 Federico Kammerichs (1998–2001)
 Luis Oroño
 Sebastián Uranga (1981–85)
 Javier Maretto
 Daniel Aréjula
 Horacio López
 Erron Maxey (2001)

Head coaches 
 León Najnudel (1976–82, 1989–90, 1996)

Titles

Domestic
 Torneo Metropolitano (1): 1980
 Torneo Oficial de la Federación de Buenos Aires (3): 1980, 1982, 1983
 Torneo de Apertura de la Federación de Buenos Aires (3): 1980, 1981, 1982
 Campeonato Argentino de Clubes (1): 1981
 Liga Nacional de Básquet (3): 1985, 1986, 1989

International
 Campeonato Sudamericano de Clubes (3): 1981, 1982, 1987

References

External links

 
 Club page on LNB website

Basketball teams in Argentina
Basketball teams established in 1941